SC Viktoria 06 Griesheim is a German football club based in Griesheim, Hesse.

History
Founded in 1906 the club enjoyed some of its best seasons through the 70s and 80s. In 1973 they advanced to the Landesliga Hessen-Süd (IV) and in their fourth season of play there emerged as champions to earn promotion to the Oberliga Hessen (III). Three seasons later in 1980–81, Viktoria Griesheim claimed the championship in that division, in a year when no promotion places were available to the Oberliga champions. That was the pinnacle as the club's achievement as they began a slide that led to an 18th-place finish and relegation in 1988. Griesheim returned to the Oberliga for a single season appearances in 1991 and 2004, but both campaigns also ended in a last place finish and relegation.

The clubplayed in the Verbandsliga Hessen-Süd (VI) as an upper table side until 2012 when a league title meant another promotion.

Honours
The club's honours:
 Oberliga Hessen
 Champions: 1981
 Landesliga Hessen-Süd
 Champions: 1977, 1990, 2003
 Verbandsliga Hessen-Süd
 Champions: 2012

Recent seasons
The recent season-by-season performance of the club:

 With the introduction of the Regionalligas in 1994 and the 3. Liga in 2008 as the new third tier, below the 2. Bundesliga, all leagues below dropped one tier. Also in 2008, a large number of football leagues in Hesse were renamed, with the Oberliga Hessen becoming the Hessenliga, the Landesliga becoming the Verbandsliga, the Bezirksoberliga becoming the Gruppenliga and the Bezirksliga becoming the Kreisoberliga.

References

External links

 Official team site
 Fan club "Drunken Zebras"
 Viktoria Griesheim at Weltfussball.de 
 Das deutsche Fußball-Archiv  historical German domestic league tables

Football clubs in Germany
Football clubs in Hesse
Association football clubs established in 1906
1906 establishments in Germany